Selkirk is a town and historic royal burgh in the Scottish Borders council district of southeastern Scotland. It lies on the Ettrick Water, a tributary of the River Tweed.

The people of the town are known as Souters, which means cobblers (shoe makers and menders). At the time of the 2011 census, Selkirk's population was 5,784.

History

Selkirk was formerly the county town of Selkirkshire. Selkirk is one of the oldest Royal Burghs in Scotland and is the site of the earliest settlements in what is now the Scottish Borders. The town's name means "church by the hall" from the Old English sele ("hall" or "manor") and cirice ("church").

Selkirk was the site of the first Borders abbey, a community of Tironensian monks who moved to Kelso Abbey during the reign of King David I. In 1113, King David I granted Selkirk large amounts of land. William Wallace was declared guardian of Scotland in the town at the Kirk o' the Forest in 1297.

Selkirk sent a contingent of 80 men to fight at the Battle of Flodden in 1513; however, only one man, "Fletcher", returned from the battle, bearing a blood-stained English flag belonging to the Macclesfield regiment.

During the series of conflicts that would become known as the Wars of the Three Kingdoms, Selkirk played host the Royalist army of James Graham, 1st Marquess of Montrose, with his cavalry installed in the burgh, whilst the Royalist infantry were camped at the plain of Philiphaugh, below the town. On the morning of 13 September 1645, a covenanting army led by Sir David Leslie attacked the royalist forces camped at Philiphaugh, and a rout ensued. Montrose arrived to find his army in disarray and had to the flee the field. The surrendered Royalist troops were subsequently executed.

The novelist, Sir Walter Scott, presided, as the sheriff-depute, in the courtroom at Selkirk Town House in the early-19th century.

Selkirk grew in the mid-19th century because of its woollen industry, although it largely closed in the 1970s. The town is also known for bannocks, a dry fruit cake, which was first sold in the market place by a local baker, Robbie Douglas, in 1859.

Traditions
The Selkirk Common Riding is a celebration of the history and traditions of the Royal and Ancient Burgh. It is held on the second Friday after the first Monday in June.

Landmarks
The remains of the "forest kirk", referred to in ancient times as the church of St Mary of the Forest, still stand in the old churchyard. It is also the final resting place of several maternal ancestors of Franklin D. Roosevelt, the 32nd President of the US.

Just to the south of the town is The Haining, the late 18th-century residence of the Pringle family. In 2009 the last owner died, and left the house and grounds "for the benefit of the community of Selkirkshire and the wider public." A charitable trust is now planning to restore the building as an art gallery.

The Selkirk Grace
The Selkirk Grace has no connection with the town of Selkirk, beyond its name; it originated in the west of Scotland. Although attributed to Robert Burns, the Selkirk Grace was already known in the 17th century, as the "Galloway Grace" or the "Covenanters' Grace". It came to be called the Selkirk Grace because Burns was said to have delivered it at a dinner given by the Earl of Selkirk at St Mary's Isle Priory, in Kirkcudbright in Galloway.

In Scots 
Some hae meat and canna eat,
And some wad eat that want it,
But we hae meat and we can eat,
Sae let the Lord be thankit.

In English
Some have meat and cannot eat,
And some would eat that want it,
But we have meat and we can eat,
So let God be thanked.

Sport
Rugby union plays its role in Selkirk culture and society. Selkirk RFC play in their home games at Philiphaugh, competing in the Scottish Premiership and the Border League.

The town cricket club was formed in 1851 and still plays in the Border League. The cricket ground at Philiphaugh is the site of the Battle of Philiphaugh.

The town also has a footballing tradition, having produced some players of note in the Scottish game including Bobby Johnstone of Hibernian.

Notable people

James Blair (1825–1901), Canadian farmer, born in Selkirk
Peter Blake (1951–2018), film and television actor
James Brown (J.B. Selkirk) (1832–1904), poet and essayist
James Marr Brydone (1779–1866), surgeon who sighted the French fleet, signalling the beginning of the Battle of Trafalgar
Rae Hendrie (b. 1977), television actress
Scott (1981-2018) and Grant Hutchison (b. 1984), members of the indie rock band Frightened Rabbit
Bobby Johnstone (1921–2001), Scotland international footballer and a member of the Hibernian Famous Five forward line
Andrew Lang (1844–1912), poet, novelist, literary critic and contributor to anthropology
Gideon Lang, Australian pastoralist and parliamentarian
Sandy McMahon (1871–1916), Scotland international footballer and Celtic's eighth highest all-time top goal scorer
Will H. Ogilvie (1869–1963), Scottish-Australian poet
Mungo Park (1771–1806), explorer of the African continent
John Roberts (1845–1934), wool merchant
John Rutherford (b. 1955), Scotland international rugby player, played for Selkirk R. F. C.
Tom Scott (1854–1927), artist
James Sorley FFA FRSE (1853–1923) Treasurer of Scottish Life Assurance Company
Tibbie Tamson, alleged to be variously a victim of the Scottish witch trials, a suicide victim, a plague victim, or a murder victim

Climate
Like the rest of the British Isles, Selkirk has a maritime climate with cool summers and mild winters. However the area appears to have one of the widest absolute temperature ranges in the United Kingdom.

Twinning
 Plattling, Bavaria.

See also

Selkirkshire
Selkirk Rugby Club
Selkirk Football Club
List of places in the Scottish Borders

References

External links
Selkirk online website

 
Towns in the Scottish Borders
County towns in Scotland
Royal burghs

Parishes in Selkirkshire
Populated places established in the 6th century
Eildon